Sri Madhopur is a city and a municipality, nearby Sikar City in Neem ka thana district in the Indian state of Rajasthan. It was founded on 18 April 1761 under the reign of Maharaja Sawai Madho Singh I. It was mainly famous for his temples. Shrimadhopur's Wheat market is the biggest wheat market in Neem ka thana district. Shrimadhopur Government school is one of the biggest school of the Neem ka thana district. It is one of the six tehsils of the district. Dedicated Delhi-Mumbai Freight Corridor is passing through this city. This city is chosen for the development of crossing station on this route (Shrimadhopur DFC Station).

History

Sri Madhopur or Shrimadhopur is a city and a municipality in Neem ka thana district in the Indian state of Rajasthan. It was founded by Pradhan Dewan of Jaipur Khushali Ram Bohra a khandelwal brahmin of khandela.

Demographics
 India census, Sri Madhopur had a population of 31,366. Males constitute 52.6% of the population and females 47.3%. Sri Madhopur has an average literacy rate of 85.53%, higher than the national average of 74.04%: male literacy is 93.69%, and female literacy is 72.45%. In Sri Madhopur, 12.24% of the population is under 6 years of age.

Location
Sri Madhopur is located 12 km from the National Highway 11 (India). The nearest railway junction is at Sri Madhopur, and the nearest airport is Jaipur International Airport at Jaipur. It is 75 km from the state capital city Jaipur, and 217 km from the national capital Delhi.

Connectivity with Metro Cities
Shrimadhopur city has direct connectivity with different metro cities such as Delhi, Mumbai through railway network of India. The direct trains are available from Shrimadhopur to Mumbai, Delhi and Chandigarh.

References

Cities and towns in Sikar district